Helen Bershad (born 1934, Philadelphia, United States) is an American abstract expressionist painter.

Career
She graduated from Moore College of Art.

She was noted for her unique and intense use of color. She has exhibited in galleries in New York City, Philadelphia, Los Angeles and other cities in the United States.

Her work is in the collection of the Philadelphia Museum of Art, Woodmere Art Museum, and other museums and private collections.

References

Sources
 Woodmere Art Museum (Philadelphia) catalogue 1997 "Helen Bershad Retrospective"

1934 births
Living people
Moore College of Art and Design alumni
American women painters
Painters from Pennsylvania
21st-century American women artists